Thornlie Senior High School is an independent public co-educational high day school in the City of Gosnells, located off Ovens Road in the Perth suburb of Thornlie, Western Australia.

The school was established in 1971 and caters for students from Years 7 to Year 12. It is located in the Canning educational district and has had enrolments as high as 1200 students.

The school caters for students in years 7 to 12. The school offers a specialist Rugby program. As well as preparing students for university—the school includes a comprehensive vocational education and training pathway for students in years 11 and 12.

In 2013, Prime Minister Julia Gillard held Community Cabinet at the high school. The event was booked out, and a small group of animal rights activists held a peaceful protest outside the event.

Enrolments at the school have been relatively stable with around 1100 students. However—between 2009-2013—student numbers dropped below 1000 due to changes in enrolment ages.

Academic rankings

In 2010 four students from the school were awarded Certificates of Excellence by the Curriculum Council of Western Australia and one student was awarded the University of Western Australia Fogarty Foundation award.

WA school ATAR ranking

Year 12 student achievement data

Notable alumni
 Glenn Sterle - Australian Senator for Western Australia.

See also

 List of schools in the Perth metropolitan area

References

External links 
 Thornlie Senior High School (website)

Public high schools in Perth, Western Australia
1971 establishments in Australia
Educational institutions established in 1971